Dunvant Male Choir is the oldest continuously singing Welsh choir and is based in Dunvant, Swansea, Wales.

History
The choir was founded in 1895, in the country traditionally known as the "land of song".  Singing in harmony is synonymous with the Welsh choir and Wales has a history of using music as a primary form of communication.

The arrival of the railway in 1867 changed Dunvant and its surrounding villages forever.  It allowed the development of the coal seams in the area, local quarries, brick works and an iron foundry.  It attracted people to move into the village and with the spread of new housing, to triple the size of the village.  By good fortune the station master at Dunvant on the London and North Western Railway, Mr Isaac Peters (Station Master 1880–1892), was a man of some musical talent and he stirred the musical interests of the village by leading a mixed choir at Siloam Chapel and using the station waiting room for rehearsals of the Killay and Dunvant united choir.

As the number of villagers grew so did the need for Dunvant to have its own chapel, and Ebenezer was built in 1872, expanded in 1882 and rebuilt in 1893, becoming the heart of the village.

As more villagers attended Ebenezer and the great religious revival of the 1890s took hold, David Evans of Three Crosses who had trained under Joseph Parry, was a fine tenor and had won several eisteddfod prizes, started a small male-only group at Ebenezer and also formed Gowerton Male Choir around 1890.

This was developed by Thomas Coslett Richards, father of the well-known Dunvant painter Ceri Richards, who drew male members of Ebenezer and other chapel choirs to form the Dunvant Ebenezer Excelsior Male Voice Choir in 1895 and laid the foundation for its success in local eisteddfods, taking 1st prize at the Gwyn Hall in Neath in 1901 and being presented with an oak chair that is in Ebenezer Chapel to this day.

The choir's 125th anniversary concert was postponed due to the 2020 COVID-19 pandemic, and was eventually held in April 2022 in the Brangwyn Hall, Swansea. The choir's activities during the pandemic were described in a BBC Radio Wales documentary called Still Singing: Dunvant Male Choir.

A statement to prospective members reads, “You do not have to be a trained singer or be able to read music, all you need is to enjoy singing and be willing to learn”.

Discography
Albums

Flash mobs

The choir is increasingly well-known for several flash mob performances when they have arrived at random locations around the City of Swansea and performed unannounced.  The choir has performed in the Quadrant Shopping Centre, Swansea Marina, on the seafront at Mumbles and more recently in Swansea Market. and St David's Shopping Centre, Cardiff.

Tours
One visit that has resulted in the choir's great friendship was in 1965 with Sangervereinigung 1866 Essen Burg Altendorf visit to Dunvant, with a return visit to Germany and the Menin Gate, Ypres in 1966.

In 2015 the choir celebration 50 years of friendship with the choir when it performed in Burg Altendorf Church and the Philharmonie Hall, Essen.

The choir embarked on its first North American tour in 1985 when it travelled with a young Bryn Terfel as a soloist. Further tours saw the choir visit Toronto, Ottawa, Atlanta, Jacksonville, Washington State, Seattle, Portland Oregon and a tour to Singapore in 2012.

August 2024 sees a planned tour to Pittsburgh, Pennsylvania in partnership with the North American Festival of Wales.

Young Singer of the Year competition
The choir launched "The Welsh Musical Theatre Young Singer of the Year" competition in 2003 and it's taken place every year except 2019 due to national lockdowns.  The name changed in 2020 and the Young Singer competition was born.  The competition supports young singers from the Swansea, Neath Port Talbot and Carmarthenshire areas and offers a cash prize and the chance to sing with the choir in a concert.

In 2005, Hayley Gallivan won the competition and is went on to be an understudy for Elphaba in Wicked.

Connie Fisher won the competition 2006, she followed this up by winning the BBC One talent contest How Do You Solve a Problem Like Maria?, subsequently opening as Maria von Trapp in The Sound of Music in the West End of London.

Ben Joyce won in 2017 and went on to star as Frankie Valli in Jersey Boys  in the Trafalgar Theatre in the West End of London.  Ben more recently took on the lead role of Marty McFly in the West End production of Back to the Future at the Adelphi Theatre

Notes

References

External links
 
 Dunvant Male Choir channel on YouTube
 
 
 The History of Dunvant by David Morgan
 BBC Wales, Still Singing: Dunvant Male Choir

Welsh choirs
Welsh culture
Music in Swansea